l’Hôpital du Cinquantenaire de Kinshasa is the second largest hospital in the Democratic Republic of the Congo after the Kinshasa General Hospital. The hospital is in the Mont Ngafula area south of Kinshasa, Democratic Republic of the Congo. The hospital includes include 515 beds, surgical services, infectious diseases, pediatrics, gynecology, obstetrics, ENT, nephrology, urology, cardiology, respiratory medicine and other health services.

References

Hospitals in the Democratic Republic of the Congo
Buildings and structures in Kinshasa
Lukunga District